The Innocent  is a thriller novel by American writer David Baldacci. This is the first book to feature Will Robie, a highly skilled U.S. government assassin. The book was initially published on October 9, 2012, by Grand Central Publishing.

References

External links
 Official website

2012 American novels
Novels by David Baldacci
Grand Central Publishing books